Sternarchella, the bulldog knifefish, is a genus of ghost knifefishes found at depths of  in the main channel of large rivers in South America. Most are from the Amazon basin, but S. orthos is found both in the Amazon and Orinoco, S. orinoco is restricted to the Orinoco and S. curvioperculata restricted to the upper Paraná basin (however, the last species likely belongs in another genus, possibly Apteronotus). They are often common in their habitat.

They feed on invertebrates and small fish.

Species
The following species are currently placed in this genus. Two species that formerly comprised their own genus Magosternarchus were recently included in Sternarchella

 Sternarchella calhamazon Lundberg, Cox Fernandes, Campos-da-Paz & Sullivan, 2013
 Sternarchella curvioperculata Godoy (pt), 1968 – likely does not belong in this genus, closer to Apteronotus
 Sternarchella duccis Lundberg, Cox Fernandes & Albert
 Sternarchella orinoco Mago-Leccia, 1994
 Sternarchella patriciae Evans, Crampton & Albert 2017
 Sternarchella raptor Lundberg, Cox Fernandes & Albert
 Sternarchella rex Evans, Crampton & Albert 2017
 Sternarchella schotti (Steindachner, 1868)
 Sternarchella sima Starks, 1913
 Sternarchella terminalis (C. H. Eigenmann & W. R. Allen, 1942)

References

Apteronotidae
Fish of South America
Freshwater fish genera
Taxa named by Carl H. Eigenmann